Cholanic acid is a carboxylic acid derivative of the cholane class of steroids.  It is a component of bile.

References 

Carboxylic acids
Cholanes